In re The Bible Speaks (also cited as Elizabeth Dovydenas vs. The Bible Speaks) is a case involving the legal concept undue influence as it pertained to a religious charity.

Facts and Case Resolution
Between the years 1984 and 1985, Elizabeth (Betsy) Dovydenas (an American heiress of the Dayton Hudson fortune) donated $6.5 million to The Bible Speaks, a ministry founded by Carl H. Stevens Jr. based in Lenox, Massachusetts.  Betsy also changed her will, leaving her estate to the ministry and disinheriting her husband Jonas Dovydenas as well as her children.

But only a year later in 1986, Betsy and her family brought a lawsuit against Stevens and The Bible Speaks, seeking to recover the $6.5 million, on the basis that Stevens had unduly influenced her to make the donations and change her will to leave him her inheritance.

The presiding judge said in his 60-page decision (ruling in favor of Betsy) that the testimony revealed "an astonishing saga of clerical deceit, avarice, and subjugation" by Stevens, who "has abused the trust of the claimant as well as the trust of many good and devout members of the church."   He described Betsy as intelligent and trusting, but said Stevens achieved "total dominion and control over her."

Jeffrey G. Sherman, a writer for the Brooklyn Law Review, analyzed the meaning of the case in 2008.

After the decision, The Bible Speaks declared bankruptcy and lost their property in Lenox.  Stevens relocated to Baltimore.

References

United States district court cases
1989 in United States case law